Chen Sitan (born 1967) is a taijiquan practitioner and a retired professional wushu taolu athlete.

Career 
In 1977, Chen was selected to become a member of the Fujian Provincial Wushu Team under Zeng Nailiang. At the 1990 Asian Games, Chen won the first gold medal for China in men's taijiquan. He then went on to become a two-time world champion, doing so at the 1993 and the 1997 World Wushu Championships. He also won the gold medal in taijiquan at the 1997 National Games of China.

Chen retired from competitive wushu in 1997 and became a coach. In 2004, he moved to the United States to establish his school, Sitan Tai Chi and Martial Arts, in New York City. He is also the chairman of the American Tai Chi Qigong Center.

See also 

 List of Asian Games medalists in wushu

References 

Living people
1967 births
Chinese wushu practitioners
Chinese tai chi practitioners
Asian Games medalists in wushu
Asian Games gold medalists for China
Wushu practitioners at the 1990 Asian Games
Medalists at the 1990 Asian Games